Colchane is a Chilean village and commune in Tamarugal Province, Tarapacá Region.

The commune is located in the Andean altiplano, bordering Bolivia. It also includes the localities of Isluga, Enquelga, Cariquima and Chijo.

Demographics
According to the 2002 census of the National Statistics Institute, Colchane had 1,649 inhabitants (910 men and 739 women),  and it is entirely rural. The population grew by 5.7% (94 persons) between the 1992 and 2002 censuses. It has the country's highest rate of people living under the poverty line at 34.56% (Encuesta Casen, 2006).

Administration
As a commune, Colchane is a third-level administrative division of Chile administered by a municipal council, headed by an alcalde who is directly elected every four years.

Within the electoral divisions of Chile, Colchane is represented in the Chamber of Deputies by Marta Isasi (Ind.) and Hugo Gutiérrez (PC) as part of the 2nd electoral district, which includes the entire Tarapacá Region. The commune is represented in the Senate by José Miguel Insulza (PS, 2018–2026) and José Durana (UDI, 2018–2026) as part of the 1st senatorial constituency (Arica and Parinacota Region and Tarapacá Region).

References 

Communes of Chile
Populated places in El Tamarugal Province
Populated places in the Altiplano